Downstream in manufacturing refers to processes that occur later on in a production sequence or production line.

Viewing a company "from order to cash" might have high-level processes such as Marketing, Sales, Order Entry, Manufacturing, Packaging, Shipping, Invoicing.  Each of these could be deconstructed into many sub-processes and supporting processes.

The Manufacturing process consists of such sub-processes as Design, Tooling, Inventory Management, Receiving, Assembly, and others.  The products being manufactured are created in a sequence of processes.  Any process occurring after another is considered to be downstream.

See also
 Agile manufacturing
 Lean manufacturing

Manufacturing